The 1966 European Wrestling Championships were held in the Greco-Romane style and  in Essen 13 - 16 May 1966; the men's Freestyle style  in Karlsruhe 05 – 08 May 1966.

Medal table

Medal summary

Men's freestyle

Men's Greco-Roman

References

External links
Fila's official championship website

Europe
W
European Wrestling Championships
1966 in European sport